Louis Shepherd LeTellier (February 8, 1887 – July 2, 1975) was an American football coach and university instructor and administrator. He was the fourth head football coach at The Citadel, serving for two seasons, from 1911 to 1912, and compiling a record of 8–6–2.

LeTellier was an instructor in the Engineering department and later became head of the Civil Engineering Department.  He served as interim President of The Citadel from the time of General Charles P. Summerall's departure in 1953 until General Mark W. Clark's arrival in 1954.  The current home of the Civil Engineering Department at The Citadel, LeTellier Hall, is named for him.

Head coaching record

References

External links
 

1887 births
1975 deaths
The Citadel Bulldogs football coaches
The Citadel, The Military College of South Carolina faculty
Presidents of The Citadel, The Military College of South Carolina
Sportspeople from Charlottesville, Virginia
20th-century American academics